Erin McGreehan (born July 1982) is an Irish Fianna Fáil politician who has served as a Senator since June 2020, after being nominated by the Taoiseach.

Early life
McGreehan grew up in Castletowncooley, a townland in the north of County Louth, and attended Bush Post Primary School.

Political career
She previously served as a member of Louth County Council from 2019 to 2020. In June 2020, she was nominated by the Taoiseach, Micheál Martin, to Seanad Éireann. Andrea McKevitt was co-opted to McGreehan's seat on Louth County Council following her nomination to the Seanad.

Personal life
McGreehan lives on the Cooley Peninsula with her partner, Donal McMorland, and their four children; they run an engineering business.

References

External links
Erin McGreehan's page on the Fianna Fáil website

1982 births
Living people
Members of the 26th Seanad
21st-century women members of Seanad Éireann
Politicians from County Louth
Fianna Fáil senators
Nominated members of Seanad Éireann